Psi function can refer, in mathematics, to
the ordinal collapsing function 
the Dedekind psi function 
the Chebyshev function 
the polygamma function  or its special cases
the digamma function 
the trigamma function 

and in physics to
 the quantum mechanical wave function.